Grossoseta johnsoni is a species of flat-footed flies (insects in the family Platypezidae).

References

Platypezidae
Insects described in 1961
Taxa named by Edward L. Kessel